State Highway Spur 260 (Spur 260), also known as Jaime Zapata Memorial Highway, is a state highway in southeastern Laredo, Texas, connecting U.S. Highway 83 (US 83) and State Highway 359 (SH 359). The route was designated in 2008 but continued to be signed as part of State Highway Loop 20 (Loop 20) until the opening of Cuatro Vientos Road in July 2011, when the Loop 20 designation was shifted to the new route.  The contemporary Spur 260 constitutes the original extent of Loop 20, as originally designated in 1939.

Route description
Spur 260 begins at an intersection with US 83 and Ross Street. The route continues east-northeast to Ejido Avenue with commercial development on both sides. Past Ejido Avenue, commercial businesses continue to flank the south side of the road, while the north side is undeveloped until the intersection with Los Presidentes Avenue. From there, the north side of the highway becomes more industrial, while the south side continues to serve commercial buildings. Spur 260 turns north before reaching its eastern terminus at SH 359 and the Loop 20 frontage road, with the main lanes of Loop 20 passing overhead.

History

The number originally belonged to Loop 260, designated on August 20, 1952, from US 80 via Fort Worth Avenue and Commerce Street to US 80. On June 25, 1991, Loop 260 was cancelled and removed from the state highway system. On August 28, 1991, the section of US 80 along Davis Street and Zang Boulevard was removed from the state highway system.

Junction list

References

260
Highways in Laredo, Texas
Transportation in Webb County, Texas